The Lenovo IdeaCentre A740 is an all-in-one desktop computer with a 27-inch touchscreen released by Lenovo in 2014.

Specifications and features

The A740 has a 27-inch frameless glossy screen with a resolution of up to 2560x1440 and capacitive ten-finger touch technology. The A740's screen is only 0.15" at its thinnest point. The screen is anchored by a base which includes most of the unit's hardware and all of its ports, and the mount allows adjusting the angle from 90 degrees down to -5 degrees – one example use is as a "chess board".

The A740 uses a quad-core Intel Core-i7 processor, 8 gigabytes of RAM, and a 1-terabyte Solid State Hybrid Drive with an 8GB SSD part. There is no optical drive in the machine itself, but a USB DVD burner is given as a standard accessory along with the USB (wireless) keyboard and mouse. Ports include ethernet, HDMI, combined audio jack for headphones/microphone, four USB 3.0 connections and a 6-in-1 card reader. The A740's ability to accept HDMI input allows for using the screen with external devices. An internal TV-tuner is optional.

Reviews

In a review published by Techaeris, Alex Hernandez wrote "Overall the A740 scores a 4.3 out of 5 here. There are some great things about this all-in-one and just a few things that need improvement. The hardware and design are great on this machine, Lenovo has been doing some very awesome things in that department. The display is a high point as well and even the price and value is right up there and competes with Apple’s iMac".

References

External links
 Product page on Lenovo.com

Products introduced in 2014
Lenovo